CJMB-FM (90.5 MHz) is a Canadian radio station branded as Freq 90.5, which is licensed to Peterborough, Ontario. The station is owned by My Broadcasting Corporation and it airs an alternative rock format. The station is a network affiliate of Sportsnet Radio and CBS Sports Radio. Weekdays it carries the Jim Rome Show from CBS Sports Radio, which also supplies late night programming.

The studios and offices are on George Street in Peterborough. The transmitter is off Greencrest Drive.

History
The station received CRTC approval on June 9, 2004  and was launched at 99.5 FM on November 25, 2004, at 80 Hunter St. East by King's Kids Promotions Outreach Ministries with a christian format including talk and music. The studios later moved to the Kingswood Life Center at 993 Talwood Drive.

Formerly known as "KAOS" radio, the station's first call letters were CKKK-FM.

In March 2007, CKKK-FM applied to move to 90.5 FM. CKPT, then on 1420 AM, was approved in 2007 to move to 99.3 which is the adjacent frequency of 99.5. On July 9, 2007, CKKK received CRTC approval to move to 90.5 FM.

On August 20, 2007, CKKK-FM moved from 99.5 MHz to its current frequency at 90.5 MHz just over a month after the approval from the CRTC.

On March 31, 2008, CKKK went dark after being blocked from its new tower site at 1001 Talwood Drive. This, despite the fact that the project was approved by the CRTC and Industry Canada in August 2007.

The station, plus previous and current ownership of the tower site at 1001 Talwood Drive were not able to resolve differences.

Sale to McNabb & new format
The CRTC approved the sale of the station on June 26, 2009, to Andy McNabb, on behalf of a company to be incorporated. Soon after, a corporate structure was formed, 100% owned by Andy McNabb, and 4352416 Canada Inc. was incorporated. The station then adopted its current call letters CJMB-FM.

On December 3, 2009, the CRTC approved the station's application for a new tower site and a power increase from 50 to 206 watts.

CJMB-FM began testing their new signal broadcasting at 90.5 MHz on October 14, 2010, at 4:05 PM, featuring the song "Stronger" by Hillsong Church.

In December 2010, the station finished its technical testing and became the only station in the city broadcasting "Local News Every Hour", as well as the only station in the city broadcasting "All Christmas Music, All The Time" during the holiday season. In addition, the station presented play-by-play coverage of the Peterborough Petes, Toronto Maple Leafs and the Toronto Blue Jays.

The licence was awarded personally to Andy McNabb, who is the 100% owner of the assets of CJMB-FM and 100% owner of the shares of the corporate structure.

With no change in effective control, the matter of transfer of assets from the corporate holdings that are 100% owned by one person, directly to a portfolio of personal holdings that are 100% owned by the same person, would be published by the CRTC when said filings are deemed as processed by CRTC staff.

Sale to My Broadcasting Corporation 
On May 17, 2013, My Broadcasting Corporation took over the management of CJMB-FM from McNabb Broadcasting. My Broadcasting Corporation applied to the CRTC to purchase the assets of CJMB-FM. In the interim, the CRTC provided My Broadcasting approval to operate CJMB-FM under a temporary management agreement.

Under its ownership, CJMB flipped to talk radio as Extra 90.5, carrying a mix of local news and information programming, as well as sports talk programs (including CBS Sports Radio's The Jim Rome Show and John Feinstein), and coverage of the Peterborough Lakers alongside existing play-by-play for the Petes, Maple Leafs and Blue Jays. The station planned to air a block of Christian programming on Sundays in order to meet the station's license conditions for the airplay of religious music; My Broadcasting president Jon Pole noted that the license called for 95% of music played by the station to be religious music, but that this would merely be a technicality since the majority of its new lineup was spoken word programming.

In February 2016, the station picked up Bubba the Love Sponge, becoming the program's first-ever Canadian affiliate.

On June 26, 2020, the station rebranded as Freq 90.5, flipping to a gold-based alternative rock format with focus on hits from the 1990s and 2000s. The station will retain its sports play-by-play.

Notable announcers
John Badham hosted the show The Regulars from 2013 to 2016.

References

External links

 

Modern rock radio stations in Canada
Radio stations in Peterborough, Ontario
Radio stations established in 2004
2004 establishments in Ontario
My Broadcasting radio stations